The 7th Louisiana Regiment Infantry (African Descent) was a regiment in the Union Army during the American Civil War. The regiment served in Mississippi, Louisiana and Arkansas and mustered out March 13, 1866.

Service in the District of Vicksburg
The regiment was first organized and on duty in New Orleans, Louisiana for 60 days from July 10 to August 6, 1863. The unit was involved in a skirmish at Vidalia, Louisiana on February 7, 1864.

64th Regiment Infantry U.S. Colored Troops
The designation of the unit was changed to the 64th Regiment Infantry U.S. Colored Troops on March 11, 1864.

See also

List of Louisiana Union Civil War units
Caesar Antoine - Captain of Company I

References

Infantry, 007
Louisiana Infantry, 007
Military units and formations established in 1863
1863 establishments in Louisiana
Military units and formations disestablished in 1864